From 1906 to 1926, the Finnish Swimming Federation did not arrange a dedicated national competition, but spread out the hosting duties of the championship events to multiple clubs.

Diving

Men

Plain 
Competed in Vaasa on 20–21 August 1907.

Source:

Women

Platform 
Competed in Vaasa on 20–21 August 1907.

Source:

Swimming

Men

100 metre freestyle 
Competed on in Helsinki on 16 August 1907.

Source:

1000 metre freestyle 
Competed in Helsinki on 18 August 1907.

Source:

200 metre breaststroke 
Competed in Vaasa on 20–21 August 1907.

Source:

100 metre life saving 
Competed in Helsinki on 17 August 1907.

Source:

4 × 50 metre freestyle relay 
Competed in Helsinki on 18 August 1907.

Source:

Women

100 metre freestyle 
Competed in Vaasa on 20–21 August 1907.

Source:

Sources

References 

National swimming competitions
National championships in Finland
Swimming competitions in Finland
1907 in Finnish sport
1907 in water sports
Diving competitions in Finland